Jade Beach and Jade Ocean are two high-rise residential condominiums located in Sunny Isles Beach, Florida. Finished in 2009, Jade Beach has 52 floors and rises , making it the second-tallest building in Sunny Isles Beach and the 18th tallest building in Florida as of early 2015. Jade Ocean has a darker colored, glass facaded, 51-story twin tower named Jade Ocean that was completed in 2008.  Both buildings were designed by architect Carlos Ott.

See also
List of tallest buildings in Sunny Isles Beach

References

Residential skyscrapers in Florida
Buildings and structures in Miami-Dade County, Florida
Skyscrapers in Florida
Twin towers
Residential buildings completed in 2009
Residential buildings completed in 2008
2009 establishments in Florida